Frances O'Connor is the name of:

Frances O'Connor, an English-born Australian actress (born 1967)
Frances O'Connor (performer), sideshow performer  (1914-1982)

See also
Francis O'Connor (disambiguation)